Panaenus, brother of Phidias, was an ancient Greek painter who worked in conjunction with Polygnotus and Micon at Athens. 

The painting of the Battle of Marathon in the Stoa Poikile is ascribed to Panaenus and to Micon and Polygnotus, who may have assisted him. 

He also painted the marble sides of the throne of the statue of Zeus erected by his brother at Olympia.

References

Ancient Greek painters
5th-century BC Greek people
5th-century BC painters
Statue of Zeus at Olympia